Erika H. James is an American academic and businesswoman. She is the dean of the Wharton School of the University of Pennsylvania. She is both the first woman and the first Black person to lead the business school. James is known for her crisis leadership and workplace diversity research. James was named dean of the Wharton School at the University of Pennsylvania in February 2020. Her term began on July 1 of the same year.

Early life and education
Born in Bermuda, James moved to the United States as a child. She lived in St. Louis, Missouri, as well as in Texas, where she graduated from high school.

James' mother was an educator. Her stepfather was clinical psychologist Marshall Rosenberg, who influenced her choice to study psychology at Pomona College. James earned her MA and PhD in organizational psychology from the University of Michigan.

Career
James' research included work on workplace diversity and managing through a crisis. During her graduate education, James took time away from school to work for American Express.

James has said that she did not expect to work in academia after graduation, but was influenced by an academic advisor to pursue a university job. Following graduation, James turned down a number of consulting offers to become an assistant professor at Tulane University's Freeman School of Business and a visiting professor at Harvard Business School.

James was the president and owner of the Crisis Management Institute, which reported on business crises and provided crisis management training courses for firms and organizations.

In 2001, James joined the faculty at the University of Virginia Darden School of Business, where she also led the creation of the role of Associate Dean of Diversity. She was promoted to Senior Associate Dean for Executive Education in 2012. As Senior Associate Dean at Darden, James introduced the Women's Leadership Program.

In 2014, James  was named the John H. Harland Dean of Emory University's Goizueta Business School. James was the first African-American woman to be named dean in Emory's history, as well as the first African-American woman to lead a top business school in the United States. Under James, the Goizueta faculty grew by 25%. That same year, James was included in the Ebony magazine Power 100 list of the "world's most inspiring African Americans."

In 2019, James was awarded the Earl Hill Jr. Faculty Achievement and Diversity Leadership Award by the Consortium for Graduate Study in Management.

James was elected to the Board of directors of financial services company Morgan Stanley in November 2021. In 2022, she was named one of Barron's 100 Most Influential Women in Finance.

James is coauthor, with Simmons University President Lynn Perry Wooten, of The Prepared Leader: Emerge from Any Crisis More Resilient Than Before (Wharton School Press, 2022).

References 

Living people
American academic administrators
Emory University faculty
University of Michigan alumni
Freeman School of Business faculty
University of Virginia faculty
Wharton School of the University of Pennsylvania faculty
Business school deans
Women deans (academic)
Women heads of universities and colleges
Year of birth missing (living people)
Pomona College alumni
African-American women academics
American women academics
African-American academics
21st-century African-American people
21st-century African-American women